Kaloi is a village in Rohtak district of Haryana, India. It is located 16 km from Rohtak. Initially, it was a part of Rohtak district. This is one of the very few villages which has two panchayats (Kaloi Dopana and Kaloi Khas). Villagers work in various fields such as agriculture, information technology, banking, business and in various government departments. Its pin code is 124401.

Location
This village is situated in Rohtak district and located approximately 15 km far from the main city. Fairly connected to the main roads and has good road transport facilities to the villagers for commuting. The village is reachable from two sides of Rohtak Directly. Nearby villages are Rurki, Rithal, Gumana, Ladhot, Polangi and Bhalaut.

Mandir
There is a huge temple of Lord Shiva on the outskirts of the village and almost every person go there for worship.  It is said about the Shiv Mandir that lord shiva came to somebody's dream and asked him to create a temple at that place. This is also believed that all wishes will be fulfilled if you come to the temple regularly. People from far also come for the Darshan of Mahadev and a huge holy fair is being organised twice in a year around the temple on occasion of shivratri.

School
Kiloi village has contributed a lot in Sarva Shiksha Abhiyan. There are many schools in the village and one ITI. The village has two government senior secondary schools and some private institutions such as:
  Hans Ram Memorial Senior Secondary School, Kiloi Rohtak Haryana
 Baba Nagar Das Public School, Kiloi, Rohtak, Haryana
 S.D. Public School, Kiloi, Rohtak, Haryana
 Sheetal Polytechnic.

Post office
Kiloi has two panchayats but it has only one post office situated in Kiloi Dopana.

Tourist place
Shiv Mandir is a religious place in Kiloi. People come here from all places. 
 Shiv Mandir, Kiloi, Haryana

References

Villages in Rohtak district